Francis Drake Lubega commonly known as Drake Lubega is a Ugandan businessman. According to a 2012 report, he was one of the wealthiest people in Uganda.

Businesses and investments
His investment vehicle is called Jesco Industries Limited (JIL). Drake is the majority shareholder. The company was incorporated on 7 October 2005. JIL owns and controls buildings and parcels of land in Uganda's capital city of Kampala and in areas outside that city.

Personal life
Drake's first wife by traditional marriage is Nalongo Grace Nakitto, together they are the parents of seven children. Two twin girls are where the title Salongo derives from. Since separating from Nakitto, Drake dated Benita from 1997 and married her in 2000. Drake and Benita Lubega's wedding was on 23 December 2000 at Namirembe Cathedral. The couple divorced in 2013 and Drake married a new wife in a Kiganda traditional ceremony. Together, they are the parents of four children.

Conviction for Dealing In Substandard Products 
On September 25, 2019 Lubega was found guilty and convicted on 2 counts of: fabricating substandard goods that do not conform to the Uganda National Bureau of Standards (UNBS) standards and for making a false representation on a commodity by forging the UNBS logo following his confession after he had spent a night at Luzira maximum prison.

References

External links
 Common Sense: Why Drake Lubega’s woes could spoil it for many men
 Museveni Secures Muslim Properties from Drake Lubega

Ugandan businesspeople
Living people
Ganda people
People from Kampala District
Year of birth missing (living people)
Ugandan businesspeople in real estate